Jacob Thomas Whetton (born 15 June 1991) is an Australian field hockey player who plays as a forward for the Australian national team.

Personal life
Whetton is from Queensland and considers Brisbane his home town. He was born on 15 June 1991. He lives in Perth, Western Australia. His nickname is Whetty.

Club career
Whetton plays for the Queensland Blades in the Australian Hockey League where he wears number 21. He played three seasons for the Punjab Warriors in the Hockey India League. In the inaugural Hockey One season in 2019 he played for the Brisbane Blaze. In February 2020 he signed a two-year contract at Oranje-Rood in the Dutch Hoofdklasse from the 2020–21 season onwards. After the postponement of the 2020 Summer Olympics to 2021 the transfer was cancelled.

International career
In December 2011, Whetton was named as one of fourteen players to be on the 2012 Summer Olympics Australian men's national Olympic development squad.  While this squad is not in the top twenty-eight and separate from the Olympic training coach, the Australian coach Ric Charlesworth did not rule out selecting from only the training squad, with players from the Olympic development having a chance at possibly being called up to represent Australia at the Olympics.  He trained with the team from 18 January to mid-March in Perth, Western Australia. Since his debut in 2011 he has played 209 times for the Kookaburras.

Whetton was selected in the Kookaburras Olympics squad for the Tokyo 2020 Olympics. The team reached the final for the first time since 2004 but couldn't achieve gold, beaten by Belgium in a shootout.

References

External links
 
 
 

1991 births
Living people
Australian male field hockey players
Male field hockey forwards
2014 Men's Hockey World Cup players
Field hockey players at the 2014 Commonwealth Games
Field hockey players at the 2016 Summer Olympics
Field hockey players at the 2018 Commonwealth Games
Field hockey players at the 2022 Commonwealth Games
2018 Men's Hockey World Cup players
Commonwealth Games medallists in field hockey
Commonwealth Games gold medallists for Australia
Olympic field hockey players of Australia
Sportspeople from Brisbane
Hockey India League players
Field hockey players at the 2020 Summer Olympics
Olympic silver medalists for Australia
Medalists at the 2020 Summer Olympics
Olympic medalists in field hockey
21st-century Australian people
Sportsmen from Queensland
2023 Men's FIH Hockey World Cup players
Medallists at the 2014 Commonwealth Games
Medallists at the 2018 Commonwealth Games
Medallists at the 2022 Commonwealth Games